KFC Moerbeke is a Belgian football club based in Moerbeke. The club is member of the Royal Belgian Football Association with the matricule number 2990. The main coulours are white and green.

External links
 Official Facebook

Football clubs in Belgium
Association football clubs established in 1927
1927 establishments in Belgium
KFC Moerbeke